Lee In-jae (Korean: 이인재; born October 1, 1971) is a former South Korean footballer who played as a forward. 

Lee started his professional career at Lucky-Goldstar FC. He was in the squad of South Korea under-20 team in 1984.

References

External links 
 

1967 births
Living people
Association football forwards
FC Seoul players
K League 1 players
South Korean footballers
Chung-Ang University alumni
South Korea under-20 international footballers